The Jawaharlal Nehru University Students' Union or JNUSU is a students' union at Jawaharlal Nehru University, New Delhi.

The JNUSU follows the student drafted JNUSU constitution.

The Students' Union has four central panel positions. These are the posts of President, Vice President, General Secretary and Joint Secretary.

An EPW study notes how in the last four decades (1974–2008 and 2012–17), in the JNUSU elections, the Students’ Federation of India (SFI) has won the post of president 22 times while All India Students’ Association (AISA) has won it 11 times while Akhil Bhartia Vidhyarti Parishad (ABVP) has won it once. Notable presidents of JNUSU include CPI(M) politician Sitaram Yechury who was president in 1977-78, Congress National Secretary Shakeel Ahmed Khan in 1992-93 and Congress Rajya Sabha MP Syed Naseer Hussain in 1999-2000. Vijoo Krishnan became the president of JNUSU in 1998. D Raghunandan, D. P. Tripathi, Nalini Ranjan Mohanty also served as President.

Chandrashekhar Prasad another president of the JNSU was assassinated after joining politics in Bihar in 1997.

JNUSU elections 
JNUSU elections are conducted by students through an elected Election Committee. In 2006, the Lyngdoh Committee, formed to frame guidelines for 'Students’ Union Elections' across the country noted that there is no need for altering the JNU model and that JNU's model would be "difficult to replicate elsewhere". However the JNUSU passed a resolution in 2016 to hold the elections via the JNUS constitution and not the Lyngdoh Committee model.

The Students Union has four central panel positions. These are the posts of President, Vice President, General Secretary and Joint Secretary. Other posts include Councillors for each of the Schools and as well as a part time Councillor. In 2019 there were 43 Councillors.

After 2015, the left parties have been fighting the elections as one unit under the umbrella of United Left.

Union Presidents
JNU is known for best Presidential debates by all candidates before elections.

SFI has won the post of President the maximum number of times in the last 40 years, a total of 22 times. All India Students’ Association (AISA) follows by having won the presidents post 11 times.  SFI, AISF and AISA are the student wings of the Communist Parties.

Presidents of JNUSU

While some JNUSU presidents joined politics after JNU other presidents such as V. Lenin Kumar and Dhananjay Tripathi pursued academics. Those who joined politics include Ashutosh Kumar who joined CPI-ML(Liberation), Kanhaiya Kumar joined the CPI and Sandeep Singh joined the Indian National Congress.

Sandeep Mahapatra has been the only JNUSU president from Akhil Bharatiya Vidyarthi Parishad (ABVP).

Notable student organisations
These student organisations contest in JNUSU:
Akhil Bharatiya Vidyarthi Parishad (ABVP)
All India Students Association (AISA)
All India Students Federation (AISF)
Students' Federation of India (SFI)
Muslim Students Federation - MSF (MSF)
Fraternity Movement (FM)
Campus Front of India (CFI) 
Birsa Ambedkar Phule Students' Association (BAPSA)
Students Islamic Organisation of India (SIO) 
National Students' Union of India (NSUI)
Mithila Student Union (MSU) (Supporting DSU)
All India Democratic Students Organisation (AIDSO) (Supporting left unity)
Democratic Students' Union (DSU) (Not contesting in elections)
Bhagat Singh Ambedkar Students Organisation] (BASO)
Democratic Students Federation (DSF)
Ambedkar Students' Association (ASA) (Supporting BAPSA)
All India Revolutionary Students Federation (1985 - 2001) (Organised student protest - supporting DSU)
United Dalit Students’ Forum (UDSF) (Supporting BAPSA)
Students For Society (SFS) (Supporting DSU & BASO)
Student Organisation of India (SOI) (Previously)
All Idu Mishmi Students Union (AIMSU) (Supporting DSU)

See also
 Delhi University Students Union
 Banaras Hindu University Students' Union

Notes

References

Further reading 

 Shakil, Albeena (2008). "JNU Students' Elections and the Lyngdoh Recommendations". (PDF) Economic and Political Weekly. 43 (50): 15–17. ISSN 0012-9976.

External links
 

 
Students' unions in India
Jawaharlal Nehru University